D-sedoheptulose 7-phosphate isomerase (sedoheptulose-7-phosphate isomerase, phosphoheptose isomerase, gmhA (gene), lpcA (gene)) is an enzyme with systematic name D-glycero-D-manno-heptose 7-phosphate aldose-ketose-isomerase. This enzyme catalyses the following chemical reaction

 D-sedoheptulose 7-phosphate  D-glycero-D-manno-heptose 7-phosphate

In Gram-negative bacteria the enzyme is involved in biosynthesis of ADP-L-glycero-β-D-manno-heptose.

References

External links 
 

EC 5.3.1